Martin Erlić (born 24 January 1998) is a Croatian professional footballer who plays as a defender for Serie A club Sassuolo and the Croatia national team.

Club career

Early career
Hailing from the village of Tinj, Erlić started training football at NK Raštane in a nearby village. At the age of 12 he was noticed by GNK Dinamo Zagreb scouts and brought to their academy, where he would spend two years before moving on to NK Rijeka. Erlić moved abroad at the age of 16, to Parma.

Sassuolo
After Parma's bankruptcy, in 2015, Erlić went to Sassuolo.

Loan to Südtirol 
On 31 August 2017, Erlić was signed by Serie C side Südtirol on a season-long loan deal. On 8 October he made his Serie C debut for Südtirol, as a substitute replacing Filippo Sgarbi in the 70th minute of a 3–1 away defeat against Padova. On 15 October he played his first entire match for Südtirol, a 5–0 home win over Santarcangelo. On 8 November, Erlić scored his first professional goal for Südtirol in the 81st minute of a 1–0 away win over Sambenedettese. Erlić ended his season-long loan to Südtirol with 30 appearances, 1 goal and 1 assist.

Loan to Spezia 
On 10 July 2018, Erlić was loaned to Serie B club Spezia on a season-long loan deal.

Spezia
After missing most of the 2018–19 season through the injury, he rejoined Spezia on a permanent basis on 15 July 2019.

Return to Sassuolo
On 16 August 2021, Erlić's rights were sold to Sassuolo, who then loaned him back to Spezia for the 2021–22 season.

International career 
Erlić made his debut for the Croatia national team on 6 June 2022, in a 1–1 draw with France in the Nations League. As he confessed, he missed his brother's wedding in order to play the match. On 9 November 2022, Erlić was named in Zlatko Dalić's 26-man squad for the 2022 FIFA World Cup, where he remained an unused substitute as Croatia finished third.

Personal life
Erlić is a fan of Hajduk Split.

Career statistics

Club

International

Honours 
Croatia

 FIFA World Cup third place: 2022

References

External links
 
 

1998 births
Living people
Sportspeople from Zadar
Association football defenders
Croatian footballers
Croatia youth international footballers
Croatia under-21 international footballers
Croatia international footballers
U.S. Sassuolo Calcio players
F.C. Südtirol players
Spezia Calcio players
Serie A players
Serie B players
Serie C players
2022 FIFA World Cup players
Croatian expatriate footballers
Expatriate footballers in Italy
Croatian expatriate sportspeople in Italy